Sterlingville may refer to:

Sterlingville, Oregon, an abandoned mining town, now destroyed
Sterlingville, New York, a town that was destroyed when Fort Drum expanded